Texarkana Union Station is a historic train station in the Texarkana metropolitan area serving Amtrak, the United States' national passenger rail system. The Arkansas-Texas border bisects the structure; the eastern part, including the waiting room and ticket office, are in Texarkana, Arkansas, but the western part is in Texarkana, Texas, meaning stopped trains span both states. The station was built in 1928 and was added to the U.S. National Register of Historic Places in 1978. Today it is the second busiest Amtrak station in Arkansas.

History 
Texarkana Union Station was constructed and operated by Union Station Trust, a subsidiary organization created as a joint effort between the Missouri-Pacific, Texas & Pacific, Cotton Belt and Kansas City Southern railroads. E. M. Tucker, chief architect for Missouri Pacific, designed the building with a track layout and overhead concourse reminiscent of the style he had used when rebuilding Little Rock Union Depot after a 1921 fire.

The present structure replaced an earlier Texarkana station on the same site, and was opened for business on April 17, 1930, with a large celebration and dedication held on May 12, 1930, according to Missouri Pacific Lines Magazine, June 1930. The station and the federal courthouse anchor the south and north ends of State Line Avenue, the dividing line between Arkansas and Texas. In 1876, Congress mandated that the Texarkana railroad station would straddle the state line, and the building has entrances and exits into both states. Missouri Pacific and Texas and Pacific, the two carriers with the most passenger trains serving Texarkana Union Station, were able to operate through the facility without a backup move. Kansas City Southern and Cotton Belt passenger trains both made back-up moves to access the station.

Provisions were made in the original station design for a restaurant, but as a result of the Great Depression, the only food service was provided by a snack bar and news stand.

The station was listed on the National Register of Historic Places in 1978.

Filming 

In 1976, the station was used for multiple locations in Charles B. Pierce's movie, The Town That Dreaded Sundown.

Named trains serving Texarkana Union Station
The following are notable cases of trains making stop in past years at Union Station:
 Missouri Pacific Railroad and Texas and Pacific Railway
 Sunshine Special
 Texas Eagle
 Texan
 Westerner
 Kansas City Southern
 Flying Crow
 Southern Belle
 Cotton Belt
 Lone Star
 Morning Star
 Amtrak
 Inter-American
 Texas Eagle (originally Eagle; only one currently in service)

Mail and express service

During the heyday of private railroad passenger train service, Texarkana served as a major distribution point for mail and express, and a large Terminal Railway Post Office was located in and adjacent to the station. In addition, express cars originating at such distant points as New York City were routed to Texarkana, where the shipments were sorted for transportation in different trains to their final destination.

See also

List of Amtrak stations
National Register of Historic Places listings in Miller County, Arkansas
National Register of Historic Places listings in Bowie County, Texas

References

Citations

Further reading

External links

Amtrak Texas Eagle Stations - Texarkana, AR
Texarkana Amtrak Station (USA Rail Guide -- Train Web)
 Texarkana Union Station (Cotton Belt Railway website)
OAG Travel Information (Texarkana Union Station)
Flickr Photo

Amtrak stations in Arkansas
Union stations in the United States
Amtrak stations in Texas
Transportation in Bowie County, Texas
Transportation in Miller County, Arkansas
Buildings and structures in Texarkana, Arkansas
Railway Express Agency
Kansas City Southern Railway stations
Former Missouri Pacific Railroad stations
Former St. Louis Southwestern Railway stations
Former Texas and Pacific Railway stations
Railway stations in the United States opened in 1928
Railway stations on the National Register of Historic Places in Arkansas
Railway stations on the National Register of Historic Places in Texas
National Register of Historic Places in Bowie County, Texas
National Register of Historic Places in Miller County, Arkansas
Texarkana